The Scottish Rite Masonic Museum & Library, formerly known as the National Heritage Museum and the Museum of Our National Heritage, is a museum located in Lexington, Massachusetts. Its emphasis is on American history and Freemasonry, and it contains the Van Gorden-Williams Library & Archives, a Masonic research library. The museum was founded in 1975, to correspond with the start of the Bicentennial of the United States and is funded by the Northern Masonic Jurisdiction of the Scottish Rite, an appendant body of Freemasonry.  The same building houses their headquarters, it having moved in 2013 from another two buildings on the properties (a 1905-built mansion and an adjoining newer build that now houses a community center).  

The museum features general interest galleries with changing exhibits about fraternal organizations such as the Masons, American history and culture, and Lexington's role in the American Revolution.

References

External links 

History museums in Massachusetts
Museums in Middlesex County, Massachusetts
Masonic museums in the United States
Libraries in Massachusetts
Buildings and structures in Lexington, Massachusetts
Masonic buildings in Massachusetts
Museums established in 1975
1975 establishments in Massachusetts